The following is a list of rugby union video games.

See also
 Sports game

References